Patrick Clausen (born 2 July 1990) is a Danish former professional racing cyclist.

Major results

2006
 1st  Sprint, National Junior Track Championships
2011
 9th Rund um den Finanzplatz Eschborn-Frankfurt U23
2012
 1st Stage 5 Flèche du Sud
 2nd Dorpenomloop Rucphen
 7th Overall Coupe des nations Ville Saguenay
 9th Himmerland Rundt
2013
 1st Skive–Løbet
2014
 2nd Kernen Omloop Echt-Susteren
 6th Tour of Yancheng Coastal Wetlands
 7th Overall Tour of Taihu Lake
 7th Destination Thy
2015
 4th Velothon Stockholm
 6th Fyen Rundt
2017
 1st Stage 3 
 8th Scandinavian Race Uppsala
 10th Fyen Rundt
2018
 6th Skive–Løbet
 7th Overall Tour du Loir-et-Cher

References

External links

1990 births
Living people
Danish male cyclists
People from Hvidovre Municipality
Sportspeople from the Capital Region of Denmark